Note: Table widths too wide for most users; tables forced to 1920px to prevent crowding.

The following is a chronological list of buildings in the state of Arizona that are taller than 7-stories or have historical relevance, grouped by city.

By city

Casa Grande

Chandler

Flagstaff

Mesa

Phoenix

Scottsdale

Tempe

Tucson

Number of buildings

Average floor count

See also
List of tallest buildings in Phoenix
List of tallest buildings in Tucson

References 

Arizona
Tallest